The Reykjavik Open is an annual chess tournament that takes place in the capital city of Iceland. It was held every two years up to 2008, currently it runs annually. The first edition was held in 1964 and was won by Mikhail Tal with a score of 12.5 points out of 13. 
The tournament is currently played with the Swiss system, while from 1964 to 1980 and in 1992 it was a round-robin tournament.

The 2013 edition was voted the second best open tournament of the year in the world by the Association of Chess Professionals, behind Gibraltar Chess Festival.

Winners
All players finishing equal first are listed; the winner after tiebreaks is listed first.

References

The History of Reykjavik Open (1964-2012)
Complete standings on Chess-Results: 2006, 2008, 2009, 2010, 2011, 2012, 2013, 2014, 2015
The Week in Chess: 1996, 1998, 2000, 2002, 2004

External links
Official website

Chess competitions
Chess in Iceland
1964 in chess
Recurring sporting events established in 1964